"Il nous faut" is a song performed by French singer Elisa Tovati and Belgian singer-songwriter Tom Dice released from her third studio album Le syndrome de Peter Pan (2011). It was released on 11 May 2011 as a digital download in France. It peaked at number 6 in France.

Music video
A music video to accompany the release of "Il nous faut" and was uploaded to YouTube on 20 June 2011 at a total length of three minutes and six seconds.

Track listing

Chart performance
On 21 May 2011 "Il nous faut" entered the French Singles Chart at number 92, in its second week it climbed to number 48, in its third week it climbed to number 28, it has so far peaked to number 6. It has also reached number 1 in Belgium and 37 in Switzerland.

Weekly charts

Year-end charts

Certifications

Release history

References

External links
 Official website

2011 singles
Ultratop 50 Singles (Flanders) number-one singles
Ultratop 50 Singles (Wallonia) number-one singles
2011 songs
Songs written by John Mamann